Gauna serratilis is a species of snout moth in the genus Gauna. It was described by Pieter Cornelius Tobias Snellen in 1890, and is known from northern India.

References

Moths described in 1890
Pyralini